Beijing Mozilla Online Ltd, also called Mozilla China, is a limited company to help promote and deploy Mozilla products in China.

Similar to the Mozilla Corporation, Mozilla China is a for-profit company funded and created by a non-profit organization (Mozilla Foundation).

Mozilla China was founded on March 4, 2005. It is a wholly owned subsidiary of the Mozilla Corporation.

Mozilla China is co-chaired by Dr. Li Gong of Sun (China) Engineering and Research Institute (ERI) and Mingshu Li of Institute of Software, Chinese Academy of Sciences (ISCAS), both of whom will sit on the steering committee with Mitchell Baker, president of the Mozilla Foundation. 

Mozilla China built a Chinese version of the Mozilla web site, provides technical and architectural direction for Mozilla development in China, organises and operates discussion forums, and further develops Mozilla source code in China.

References

External links
 

Mozilla, China
Mozilla, China
Software companies of China
Software companies established in 2005
Chinese companies established in 2005
Companies based in Beijing